Riverview Rural High School is a secondary school located in Coxheath, Nova Scotia, Canada, a suburb of Sydney, Nova Scotia. It is attended by approximately 1000 students in grades 9 to 12. The school falls under the jurisdiction of the Cape Breton – Victoria Regional Centre for Education, and is one of the two main high schools in the region, along with Sydney Academy. Red and white are the school's colours.

History
First opening in August 1950, Riverview Rural High School was built on the former site of the Keefe farm in Coxheath, and overlooks Sydney River, from which its name is derived. The annex building was added in 1951–52 to deal with a serious overcrowding problem. The business building was added in 1969 and the gymnasium and science labs were constructed in the 1980s. A new entrance was completed in 2007, with additional plans for a new library, computer labs, art room, and science labs in the coming years. Declining enrollment numbers led to the high school's annex building being demolished in 2012, and replaced by an employee parking lot.

Riverview's first principal was H.H. Wetmore, and its longest-serving principal was Robert MacKenzie, who served as principal for 30 years. Riverview offers French Immersion Certificates, Advance Certificate Programs, university preparatory, honours level courses, business and high school graduation courses.

Administration
 Principal:      Marlene Urquhart
 Vice Principal: Scott Murchison 
 Vice Principal: Joe Bellefontaine

Notable alumni

 David Dingwall - former federal MP Liberal cabinet minister
 Craig Ferguson - former professional hockey player
 Michael Forgeron - retired rower, gold medalist, men's eights, 1992 Olympics
 Rick Ravanello - actor
 Gordie Sampson - musician, Grammy Award winning songwriter

External links
 Official Website

High schools in Nova Scotia
Schools in the Cape Breton Regional Municipality
Educational institutions established in 1950
1950 establishments in Nova Scotia